Rovio may refer to:

Kustaa Rovio, a Finnish politician from the first half of the 20th century
Rovio Entertainment, a Finnish video game company best known for being the creator of Angry Birds
Rovio Animation, an animation division of Rovio Entertainment
Rovio (robot), a Wi-Fi enabled robot manufactured by Hong Kong company WowWee
Rovio (Ticino), a municipality in the Swiss canton of Ticino